Daniel Patrick “Danny” Lohner, frequently known as Renholdër, is an American musician. He worked with Trent Reznor on numerous occasions, both with Nine Inch Nails and on the now defunct Tapeworm project. He has also played for Methods of Mayhem, and in the past was one of the founding members of industrial-thrash outlet Skrew, as well as one of the members of the Texas thrash metal band Angkor Wat.

Career

Nine Inch Nails
In 1994, Trent Reznor brought Lohner into Nine Inch Nails to play guitar, bass, and keyboards for the band live. Lohner stayed on with the band throughout the touring cycle to The Downward Spiral, both the recording and touring behind The Fragile, the live album/DVD And All That Could Have Been, and the recording of the Still EP. Lohner left Nine Inch Nails on good terms to focus on production work as Trent Reznor began working on the Nine Inch Nails album With Teeth. Lohner was featured on many NIN remixes during this time, was often heavily involved during live performances of the song "Burn", and was featured on the Nine Inch Nails recordings of "Big Man With A Gun", "Somewhat Damaged", "Even Deeper", "The Great Below", various songs from Still as well as playing various instruments on every song on And All That Could Have Been. He was a guest performer with the NIN live band during their Wave Goodbye Tour in 2009. 

In 2020 Danny Lohner was inducted into the Rock and Roll Hall of Fame as a part of Nine Inch Nails.

Marilyn Manson
He was featured on Marilyn Manson's breakthrough album Antichrist Superstar, as was most of Nine Inch Nails because of Trent Reznor's relationship with Manson, acting as his mentor in the world of music. Lohner can be heard playing the acoustic guitar on '"The Reflecting God" and lead guitar on "Angel With the Scabbed Wings."

Eminem
Lohner worked together with Eminem and Marilyn Manson on the song "The Way I Am (Danny Lohner Remix)".

Puscifer
Lohner was involved with Puscifer's first album, 2007's "V" is for Vagina, and 2007's Don't Shoot the Messenger EP and 2009's "C" is for (Please Insert Sophomoric Genitalia Reference HERE) EP, helping with engineering, remixing, and filling in instrumentation as necessary.

Metallica
After longtime bassist Jason Newsted left Metallica and the subsequent recording of the St. Anger album, Lohner was one of a selected few musicians whom the band invited to audition for the empty bassist slot (Producer Bob Rock had recorded the bass parts for the album).  Although he did not join the band, he can be seen briefly in the documentary of the making of the album and general turmoil in the band during that period, Metallica: Some Kind of Monster.

A Perfect Circle
Lohner can frequently be found contributing to movie scores with fellow Nothing Records alumni Charlie Clouser and Clint Mansell. Additionally, he does remixes for various artists under the pseudonym Renholdër (an in-joke anagram of Re: D. Lohner). This began as a result of the song of the same title, which appeared on A Perfect Circle's debut album Mer de Noms. Contrary to popular belief, Lohner did not work on this song but was later told by guitarist Billy Howerdel that the song was about him. He has appeared in all of A Perfect Circle's albums to date in one form or another and has also appeared on stage with the band.

In early 2003, A Perfect Circle's official Web site announced that Renholder would be replacing Troy Van Leeuwen as the band's second guitarist. While Lohner did receive production credit on the band's second release, Thirteenth Step, he had other obligations by the time touring began, and ex-Smashing Pumpkins guitarist James Iha stepped in to fill the void. The most notable reason for Lohner's departure was his obligation to produce the soundtrack of the movie Underworld. This soundtrack was a collection mostly consisting of tracks written, produced, remixed, and performed by Lohner and his friends in the industry, including David Bowie, TRUSTcompany, Maynard James Keenan, Johnette Napolitano, and others. Lohner worked with Richard Patrick of Filter, Wes Borland of Limp Bizkit and Black Light Burns, and Josh Freese of A Perfect Circle and Nine Inch Nails, in a project called The Damning Well. Only one song, "Awakening", was released by the group on the soundtrack. Another track, "Coward", which originally featured Amy Lee of Evanescence on guest vocals, would eventually be reworked to be included on the debut album by Black Light Burns without Lee's vocals due to collaboration restrictions from her record label Wind-Up.

In November 2004, Lohner contributed heavily to eMOTIVe, the third full-length album by A Perfect Circle. This album was mostly a collection of cover songs, but it also included "Counting Bodies Like Sheep to the Rhythm of the War Drums," a continuation of "Pet" from the band's second album, Thirteenth Step. In addition, there was an original work, titled "Passive," which was the final version of a song originally composed for the Tapeworm Project. This track subsequently appeared on the soundtrack of the film Constantine, and Lohner appeared in the video for this track. A sister to eMOTIVe, 2004 also saw the release of aMOTION, a 2-disc collection that included a CD of the band's remixes and a DVD of music videos and live material. The remix album included Lohner's remixes of "3 Libras," "Judith," "Weak and Powerless," and "The Outsider." Although these remixes had previously been available on various soundtracks and CD singles, 3 Libras was reworked slightly from its original release, and "Judith" now featured censored lyrics. On both eMOTIVe and aMOTION, Lohner was credited as a band member.

30 Seconds to Mars
Lohner was involved with Thirty Seconds to Mars in programming on their track "Fallen" from their self-titled album.

Black Light Burns
In 2005 and 2006, Lohner was involved further with Wes Borland in a project called Black Light Burns, taking on the role of producer as well as playing guitar, bass, synth, programming, and more. The project was somewhat of a successor of the Damning Well, as it involved most of its members, as well as certain portions of still unreleased material from the Damning Well. Other members included Josh Eustis of Telefon Tel Aviv and Josh Freese. The album was released on June 5, 2007, to be followed by a tour that Lohner was not able to participate in because of his current activities, despite Borland's effort to get Lohner to join the touring lineup.

Hyde
He also worked with the popular Japanese rock artist HYDE in 2005–06, recording bass tracks along with Craig Adams on Hyde's album Faith.

Ashes Divide
Lohner co-produced the album Keep Telling Myself It's Alright with his old bandmate Billy Howerdel for Howerdel's solo project ASHES dIVIDE.

Angels & Airwaves
He was also involved with former Blink-182 member Tom Delonge and his new band Angels & Airwaves in producing and programming on its track "Distraction" from its We Don't Need to Whisper album.

Fear and the Nervous System
In March 2008, it was announced that he was going to produce the debut album of Korn guitarist James "Munky" Shaffer's solo project Fear and the Nervous System.

Genghis Tron
In December 2008, Genghis Tron released Board Up The House Remixes Volume 3 (of a five-part vinyl released remix series) via Relapse Records. Lohner contributed his remix of the band's title-track song from its 2008 album, Board Up the House.

Hollywood Undead
Lohner produced rap rock band Hollywood Undead's CD/DVD, Desperate Measures, release on November 10, 2009. He also did a remix (under the alias 'Castle Renholdër') for the band's song from their debut album, "Everywhere I Go", and produced the songs "Dove & Grenade" and "How We Roll".  Lohner also provided production on the band's 2008 debut album Swan Songs, and their 2012 single "We Are".

Holy Grail
Lohner produced Crisis in Utopia, the debut album of the Californian heavy metal band Holy Grail. The album was released on October 26, 2010(in the USA).

Pentakill
Lohner produced Smite and Ignite for the fictional League of Legends band Pentakill, released June 3, 2014.

In 2017, Lohner returned to the Pentakill project, providing both vocals and production to the song "The Hex Core mk-2".

Songs By Renholdër

Remixes by Renholdër
 "Complications of the Flesh" - Nine Inch Nails from the "We're in This Together" single
 "Where Is Everybody? (Version)" - Nine Inch Nails from "Things Falling Apart"
 "Judith (Renholdër Mix)" - A Perfect Circle from aMotion" & Underworld
 "3 Libras (Feel My Ice Dub Mix)" - A Perfect Circle from "aMotion"
 "The Outsider (Apocalypse Mix)" - A Perfect Circle from "aMotion" & Resident Evil: Apocalypse
 "Weak and Powerless (Tilling My Grave Renholdër Mix)"  (with Wes Borland) - A Perfect Circle from "aMotion" & Underworld
 "The Undertaker (Renholdër Mix)" - Puscifer from "Don't Shoot the Messenger" & Underworld: Evolution
 "Sour Grapes (Late for Dinner Mix)" - Puscifer from ""V" Is for Viagra. The Remixes"
 "Bring Me the Disco King (Danny Lohner Mix)" - David Bowie (featuring Maynard James Keenan and John Frusciante) from Underworld 
 "Hole in the Earth (Renholdër Remix)" - Deftones from Underworld: Rise of the Lycans
 "Underneath the Stars (Renholdër Remix)" - The Cure (featuring Maynard James Keenan and Milla Jovovich) from Underworld: Rise of the Lycans
 "Nasty Little Perv (Renholdër Remix)" - Perry Farrell from Underworld: Rise of the Lycans
 "Over and Out (Renholdër Remix)" - Alkaline Trio from Underworld: Rise of the Lycans
 "Deathclub (Renholdër Remix)" - William Control (featuring Matt Skiba) (with Wes Borland) from Underworld: Rise of the Lycans
 "Board Up the House (Renholdër Remix)" - Genghis Tron from Underworld: Rise of the Lycans
 "Two Birds, One Stone (Renholdër Remix)" - Drop Dead, Gorgeous (with Wes Borland) from Underworld: Rise of the Lycans
 "Tick Tock Tomorrow (Renholdër Remix)" - From First to Last (with Wes Borland)  from Underworld: Rise of the Lycans
 "The Way I Am (Danny Lohner Remix)" - Eminem (featuring Marilyn Manson) from "The Way I Am" and Without Me singles
 "Denial Waits/Sword (Danny Lohner Remixes)" - ASHES dIVIDE from "Keep Telling Myself It's Alright"
 "Everywhere I Go (Castle Renholder Mix)" - Hollywood Undead from "Desperate Measures"
 "Ice (Renholdër Remix)" - LIGHTS from "The Ice Pack"
 "Made Of Stone (Renholdër Remix)" - Evanescence from the Underworld: Awakening (Original Motion Picture Soundtrack)
 "Blackout (Renholdër Remix)" - Linkin Park from the Underworld: Awakening (Original Motion Picture Soundtrack)
 "Apart (Renholdër Remix)" - The Cure from the Underworld: Awakening (Original Motion Picture Soundtrack)
 "Can't See You (featuring Renholder)" - Fake Shark from "See No Evil 2"
 "Watch Yourself (Renholdër Remix)" - Ministry from the Underworld: Awakening (Original Motion Picture Soundtrack)
 "Young Blood (Renholdër Remix)" - The Naked and Famous from the Underworld: Awakening (Original Motion Picture Soundtrack)
 "elisabeth addict (Remixed by Renholdër)" - sukekiyo from VITIUM limited edition second CD
 "Oni Przyszli (Danny Lohner Remix)" - Glaca from "ZANG"

References

External links

American industrial musicians
American keyboardists
American rock guitarists
American male guitarists
Angkor Wat (band) members
Grammy Award winners
Living people
Nine Inch Nails members
A Perfect Circle members
Alternative metal bass guitarists
Progressive metal bass guitarists
Skrew members
American male bass guitarists
21st-century American bass guitarists
The Damning Well members
Year of birth missing (living people)